Alan Jewell (19 February 1932 – 22 August 2017) was an Australian rules footballer who played for the Hawthorn Football Club in the Victorian Football League (VFL).

Notes

External links 

1932 births
2017 deaths
Australian rules footballers from Victoria (Australia)
Hawthorn Football Club players
Mansfield Football Club players